Cladosporium cucumerinum is a fungal plant pathogen that affects cucumbers.

References

External links 
 Index Fungorum
 USDA ARS Fungal Database

Fungal plant pathogens and diseases
Vegetable diseases
Cladosporium
Fungi described in 1889